Staffordshire and Stoke On Trent Partnership NHS Trust was the biggest integrated health and social care NHS organisation in England. It intended to become an NHS Foundation Trust, but it is not clear that the rules permitted a social care provider to do so.

The Trust provided community health services and adult social care and  runs Community Hospitals in Burslem (Haywood), Leek, Cheadle, Staffordshire, Longton, Staffordshire and Bradwell, Staffordshire  and services in prisons.

The Community Hospital is used either after a patient has been discharged from the University Hospital of North Staffordshire or to prevent them needing to go there in the first place.

It was runner up at the Patient Experience Network Awards in the Friends and Family Test category in 2017.

It merged with the South Staffordshire and Shropshire Healthcare NHS Foundation Trust in 2018 forming a new organisation  called Midlands Partnership NHS Foundation Trust.

See also
 Healthcare in Staffordshire
 List of NHS trusts

References 

Defunct NHS trusts